Lee Sang-il is a Korean name consisting of the family name Lee and the given name Sang-il. It may refer to:

 Lee Sang-il (footballer) (born 1979)
 Lee Sang-il (film director) (born 1974)